Jason Michael Nolf (born January 10, 1996) is an American freestyle and former folkstyle wrestler. In freestyle, Nolf is the Pan American Champion at the 79-kilograms division. As a folkstyle wrestler, he is a three-time NCAA Division I Champion, four-time finalist and two-time Big Ten Champion.

High school 
Nolf attended Kittanning High School in where he was a three-sport athlete, lettering four times in wrestling, twice in cross country and once in track and field. He was also an Outstanding Student with a 4.5 GPA. As a wrestler, he was a three-time PIAA champion with a record of 176 wins and a lone loss (later avenged) throughout his career. He was also a one-time captain of the varsity team.

College 
After graduating, Nolf was recruited by Pennsylvania State University to wrestle as a Nittany Lion.

2014–15 
Redshirt: and wrestled unattached in open tournaments, compiling a record of 15 wins and one defeat.

2015–16 
Freshman: Became the runner-up of the Big Ten Championships after losing to Isaiah Martinez in a tiebreaker loss. At the NCAA tournament, he dominantly made his way to the finals, where he suffered a close 6–5 loss to Martinez again. He was named Freshman of the Year by Intermat and compiled a record of 33 wins and two losses, both to Martínez.

2016–17 
Sophomore: Became the Big Ten Conference Champion. At the NCAA Championships, he dominated with two technical falls, one fall and two majors to claim the national title and help Penn State to win its sixth team championship. He finished second as the NCAA Outstanding Wrestler behind his teammate Zain Retherford. He posted an undefeated record of 27 wins and no losses

2017–18 
Junior: Nolf reached the quarterfinals of the Big Ten Conference championships; however, he was forced to medical forfeit the semis and finals. At the NCAA championships, he downed five opponents (two by technical fall) to claim his second title in a row and help Penn State win its third team championship in a row. He finished the season with a record of 26 wins and one loss, which was due to injury.

2018–19 
Senior: Became the Big Ten Conference Champion. At the NCAA Championships, he dominated his competition, defeating five opponents (two by technical fall, one by fall, and one by major) to claim his third consecutive title and help Penn State win its fourth consecutive team title.

Overall, Nolf is a three-time NCAA Champion, four-time finalist, four-time All-American and two-time Big Ten champion as a collegiate wrestler.  He recorded a 86-3 record during this span- two of his three losses came as a freshman against Isaiah Martinez, while the other was an injury default.

Freestyle 
Prior to competing as a senior, Nolf competed as a cadet and a junior, competing in prestigious tournaments such as the US Open and the United World Wrestling World Team Trials.

2017 
After his sophomore season in college, Nolf competed at the US Open. He opened up with three technical falls before losing a tough 8–9 to two-time World Medalist James Green. He came back with a victory but came up short in the third-place match.

After finishing fourth at the US Open, he qualified and competed at the US World Team Trials. He won his first match by technical fall but ended up losing to Jimmy Kennedy. He came back with a victory to earn a bronze medal at the tournament.

2019 
Coming fresh out of college, Nolf competed at the US Open. He teched four opponents prior to losing to James Green in a criterion decision. After the loss, he managed to come back and win his next two bouts to earn himself a bronze medal.

Due to the medal he earned at the US Open, Nolf was able to compete at the World Team Trials Challenge and decided to move up to 74 kilograms. He defeated his first three opponents and went on to face collegiate rival Isaiah Martinez in a best-of-three. He lost the first match but managed to come back with a victory, leading to a third bout in which he lost by technical fall.

In his first senior international competition, Nolf competed at the Bill Farrell Memorial. He defeated four of his opponents (two of them by technical fall) to reach the finals in where he faced Isaiah Martinez. He lost the bout by technical fall to claim the silver medal of the tournament.

2020 
In his first competition of the year, he competed at the prestigious Pan American Championships at the non-olympic 79 kilograms division. He defeated two opponents with a technical fall and a fall respectively to win the championship and qualify for the US Olympic Team Trials.

Nolf was scheduled to compete at the US Olympic Team Trials on April at State College, Pennsylvania. However, the event was postponed for 2021 along with the Olympics due to the coronavirus pandemic.

After being unable to compete due to the pandemic, Nolf wrestled '19 US National Champion Jordan Oliver on June 28 at Rumble on the Rooftop. He won the match by points.

He returned to the mats against David McFadden on September 19, at the NLWC I. He won the match on points. In the next event, he wrestled '07 Junior World Champion and '11 NCAA champion turned MMA fighter Bubba Jenkins on October 20, at the NLWC II. He won the match with a 10–0 technical fall.

2021 
To start off the year, Nolf wrestled at the NLWC V on February 23, where after tech'ing '19 Pan American Games medalist Jevon Balfour, he was defeated by reigning and two-time World Champion (at 79kg) Kyle Dake on points.

Personal life 
On June 30, 2018 (at the age of 22), Nolf married Penn State women's soccer player Maddie Elliston.

Nolf has also been known to give wrestling seminars to high-level Brazilian Jiu-Jitsu academies, and has even spent some time training in the sport, although has yet to compete in it.

Awards and honors

2020
 Rumble on the Rooftop (79 kg)
 Pan American Championships (79 kg)
2019
 Bill Farrell Memorial (74 kg)
 US World Team Trials Challenge (74 kg)
 US Open (70 kg)
 NCAA Division I (157 lbs)
 Big Ten Conference (157 lbs)
2018
 NCAA Division I (157 lbs)
2017
 US World Team Trials (70 kg)
 NCAA Division I (157 lbs)
 Big Ten Conference (157 lbs)
2016
 NCAA Division I (157 lbs)
 Big Ten Conference (157 lbs)

Freestyle record 

! colspan="7"| Senior Freestyle Matches
|-
!  Res.
!  Record
!  Opponent
!  Score
!  Date
!  Event
!  Location
|-
|Win
|36–12
|align=left| Mitch Finesilver
|style="font-size:88%"|TF 11–0
|style="font-size:88%"|February 13, 2022
|style="font-size:88%"|2022 Bout at the Ballpark
|style="text-align:left;font-size:88%;"|
 Arlington, Texas
|-
! style=background:white colspan=7 | 
|-
|Loss
|35–12
|align=left| Chermen Valiev
|style="font-size:88%"|1–6
|style="font-size:88%" rowspan=4|January 27–30, 2022
|style="font-size:88%" rowspan=4|Golden Grand Prix Ivan Yarygin 2022
|style="text-align:left;font-size:88%;" rowspan=4|
 Krasnoyarsk, Russia
|-
|Win
|35–11
|align=left| Timur Bizhoev
|style="font-size:88%"|Fall
|-
|Win
|34–11
|align=left| Josh Shields
|style="font-size:88%"|9–1
|-
|Win
|33–11
|align=left| Magomed Kardanov
|style="font-size:88%"|TF 12–1
|-
|Win
|32–11
|align=left| Khetag Tsabolov
|style="font-size:88%"|16–9
|style="font-size:88%"|December 7, 2021
|style="font-size:88%"|WOLNIK 7
|style="text-align:left;font-size:88%;"|
 Kaspiysk, Russia
|-
! style=background:white colspan=7 |
|-
|Loss
|31–11
|align=left| Carter Starocci
|style="font-size:88%"|3–4
|style="font-size:88%" rowspan=5|September 11–12, 2021
|style="font-size:88%" rowspan=5|2021 US World Team Trials
|style="text-align:left;font-size:88%;" rowspan=5| Lincoln, Nebraska
|-
|Win
|31–10
|align=left| Hayden Hidlay
|style="font-size:88%"|TF 10–0
|-
|Loss
|30–10
|align=left| Jordan Burroughs
|style="font-size:88%"|3–5
|-
|Win
|30–9
|align=left| Evan Wick
|style="font-size:88%"|TF 10–0
|-
|Win
|29–9
|align=left| Joey Lavallee
|style="font-size:88%"|TF 15–4
|-
! style=background:white colspan=7 |
|-
|Win
|28–9
|align=left| Evan Wick
|style="font-size:88%"|TF 10–0
|style="font-size:88%" rowspan=3|April 2–3, 2021
|style="font-size:88%" rowspan=3|2020 US Olympic Team Trials
|style="text-align:left;font-size:88%;" rowspan=3| Forth Worth, Texas
|-
|Loss
|27–9
|align=left| Kyle Dake
|style="font-size:88%"|TF 0–11
|-
|Win
|27–8
|align=left| David Carr
|style="font-size:88%"|TF 10–0
|-
|Loss
|26–8
|align=left| Kyle Dake
|style="font-size:88%"|0–5
|style="font-size:88%" rowspan=2|February 23, 2021
|style="font-size:88%" rowspan=2|NLWC V
|style="text-align:left;font-size:88%;" rowspan=2|
 State College, Pennsylvania
|-
|Win
|26–7
|align=left| Jevon Balfour
|style="font-size:88%"|TF 10–0
|-
|Win
|25-7
|align=left| Bubba Jenkins
|style="font-size:88%"|TF 10-0
|style="font-size:88%"|October 20, 2020
|style="font-size:88%"|NLWC II
|style="text-align:left;font-size:88%;"|
 State College, Pennsylvania
|-
|Win
|24-7
|align=left| David McFadden
|style="font-size:88%"|5-2
|style="font-size:88%"|September 19, 2020
|style="font-size:88%"|NLWC I
|style="text-align:left;font-size:88%;"|
 State College, Pennsylvania
|-
|Win
|23-7
|align=left| Jordan Oliver
|style="font-size:88%"|4-1
|style="font-size:88%"|June 28, 2020
|style="font-size:88%"|Rumble on the Rooftop
|style="text-align:left;font-size:88%;" |
 Chicago, Illinois
|-
! style=background:white colspan=7 |
|-
|Win
|22–7
|align=left| Victor Eduardo Hernández Luna
|style="font-size:88%"|Fall
|style="font-size:88%" rowspan=2|March 9, 2020 
|style="font-size:88%" rowspan=2|2020 Pan American Wrestling Championships
|style="text-align:left;font-size:88%;" rowspan=2|
 Ottawa, Canada
|-
|Win
|21–7
|align=left| Guseyn Ruslanzada
|style="font-size:88%"|TF 10–0
|-
! style=background:white colspan=7 |
|-
|Loss
|20–7
|align=left| Isaiah Martinez
|style="font-size:88%"|TF 0–12
|style="font-size:88%" rowspan=5|November 16, 2019
|style="font-size:88%" rowspan=5|2019 Bill Farrell Memorial International Open 
|style="text-align:left;font-size:88%;" rowspan=5|
 New York, New York, United States
|-
|Win
|20–6
|align=left| Vincenzo Joseph
|style="font-size:88%"|6–0
|-
|Win
|19–6
|align=left| Logan Massa
|style="font-size:88%"|7–0
|-
|Win
|18–6
|align=left| Joey Lavallee
|style="font-size:88%"|TF 10–0
|-
|Win
|17–6
|align=left| Aly Ibrahim Abdelhamid Abdelhamid
|style="font-size:88%"|TF 11–0
|-
! style=background:white colspan=7 | 
|-
|Loss
|16–6
|align=left| Isaiah Martinez
|style="font-size:88%"|TF 2–12
|style="font-size:88%" rowspan=6|May 19, 2019
|style="font-size:88%" rowspan=6|2019 US World Team Trials Challenge
|style="text-align:left;font-size:88%;" rowspan=6|
 Raleigh, North Carolina, United States
|-
|Win
|16–5
|align=left| Isaiah Martinez
|style="font-size:88%"|7–5
|-
|Loss
|15–5
|align=left| Isaiah Martinez
|style="font-size:88%"|4–9
|-
|Win
|15–4
|align=left| Logan Massa
|style="font-size:88%"|7–2
|-
|Win
|14–4
|align=left| Anthony Valencia
|style="font-size:88%"|7–0
|-
|Win
|13–4
|align=left| Brian Murphy
|style="font-size:88%"|TF 12–2
|-
! style=background:white colspan=7 | 
|-
|Win
|12–4
|align=left| Alec Pantaleo
|style="font-size:88%"|10–6
|style="font-size:88%" rowspan=7|April 27, 2019 
|style="font-size:88%" rowspan=7|2019 U.S Open Wrestling Championships
|style="text-align:left;font-size:88%;" rowspan=7|
 Las Vegas, Nevada, United States
|-
|Win
|11–4
|align=left| Brandon Sorensen 
|style="font-size:88%"|3–0
|-
|Loss
|10–4
|align=left| James Green 
|style="font-size:88%"|6–6
|-
|Win
|10–3
|align=left| Nazar Kulchytskyy
|style="font-size:88%"|TF 13–2
|-
|Win
|9–3
|align=left| Kizhan Clarke
|style="font-size:88%"|TF 10–0
|-
|Win
|8–3
|align=left| Justin Davis
|style="font-size:88%"|TF 10–0
|-
|Win
|7–3
|align=left| Kevin Jack
|style="font-size:88%"|TF 12–2
|-
! style=background:white colspan=7 | 
|-
|Win
|6–3
|align=left| Nazar Kulchytskyy
|style="font-size:88%"|7–2
|style="font-size:88%" rowspan=3|June 10, 2017
|style="font-size:88%" rowspan=3|2017 US World Team Trials
|style="text-align:left;font-size:88%;" rowspan=3|
 Lincoln, Nebraska, United States
|-
|Loss
|5–3
|align=left| Jimmy Kennedy
|style="font-size:88%"|6–8
|-
|Win
|5–2
|align=left| Alec Pantaleo
|style="font-size:88%"|TF 13–2
|-
! style=background:white colspan=7 | 
|-
|Loss
|4–2
|align=left| Steven Pami
|style="font-size:88%"|6–12
|style="font-size:88%" rowspan=6|April 29, 2017
|style="font-size:88%" rowspan=6|2017 U.S Open Wrestling Championships
|style="text-align:left;font-size:88%;" rowspan=6|
 Las Vegas, Nevada, United States
|-
|Win
|4–1
|align=left| Jason Chamberlain
|style="font-size:88%"|8–0
|-
|Loss
|3–1
|align=left| James Green
|style="font-size:88%"|8–9
|-
|Win
|3–0
|align=left| Thomas Gantt
|style="font-size:88%"|TF 10–0 
|-
|Win
|2–0
|align=left| Isaac Dukes
|style="font-size:88%"|TF 15–4
|-
|Win
|1–0
|align=left| Markus Scheidel
|style="font-size:88%"|TF 11–1
|-

NCAA record

! colspan="8"| NCAA Championships Matches
|-
!  Res.
!  Record
!  Opponent
!  Score
!  Date
!  Event
|-
! style=background:white colspan=6 |2019 NCAA Championships  at 157 lbs
|-
|Win
|19–1
|align=left|Tyler Berger
|style="font-size:88%"|MD 10–2
|style="font-size:88%" rowspan=5|March 23, 2019
|style="font-size:88%" rowspan=5|2019 NCAA Division I Wrestling Championships
|-
|Win
|18–1
|align=left|Hayden Hidlay
|style="font-size:88%"|3–2
|-
|Win
|17–1
|align=left|Christian Pagdilao
|style="font-size:88%"|TF 23–6
|-
|Win
|16–1
|align=left|John Van Brill
|style="font-size:88%"|TF 19–4
|-
|Win
|15–1
|align=left|Ben Anderson
|style="font-size:88%"|Fall
|-
! style=background:white colspan=6 |2018 NCAA Championships  at 157 lbs
|-
|Win
|14–1
|align=left|Hayden Hidlay
|style="font-size:88%"|6–2
|style="font-size:88%" rowspan=5|March 17, 2018
|style="font-size:88%" rowspan=5|2018 NCAA Division I Wrestling Championships
|-
|Win
|13–1
|align=left|Micah Jordan 
|style="font-size:88%"|TF 16–0
|-
|Win
|12–1
|align=left|Michael Kemerer
|style="font-size:88%"|6–2
|-
|Win
|11–1
|align=left|Andrew Crone
|style="font-size:88%"|6–1
|-
|Win
|10–1
|align=left|Colin Heffernan
|style="font-size:88%"|TF 22–7
|-
! style=background:white colspan=6 |2017 NCAA Championships  at 157 lbs
|-
|Win
|9–1
|align=left|Joey Lavallee
|style="font-size:88%"|MD 14–6
|style="font-size:88%" rowspan=5|March 18, 2017
|style="font-size:88%" rowspan=5|2017 NCAA Division I Wrestling Championships
|-
|Win
|8–1
|align=left|Tyler Berger
|style="font-size:88%"|MD 13–5
|-
|Win
|7–1
|align=left|Bryant Clagon
|style="font-size:88%"|Fall
|-
|Win
|6–1
|align=left|Victor Lopez
|style="font-size:88%"|TF 24–9
|-
|Win
|5–1
|align=left|Thomas Bullard
|style="font-size:88%"|TF 22–7
|-
! style=background:white colspan=6 |2016 NCAA Championships  at 157 lbs
|-
|Loss
|4–1
|align=left|Isaiah Martinez
|style="font-size:88%"|5–6
|style="font-size:88%" rowspan=5|March 17, 2016
|style="font-size:88%" rowspan=5|2016 NCAA Division I Wrestling Championships
|-
|Win
|4–0
|align=left|Chad Walsh
|style="font-size:88%"|TF 19–4
|-
|Win
|3–0
|align=left|Joe Smith
|style="font-size:88%"|MD 11–3
|-
|Win
|2–0
|align=left| May Bethea
|style="font-size:88%"|TF 25–10
|-
|Win
|1–0
|align=left|Kamael Shakur
|style="font-size:88%"|Fall
|-

Stats 

!  Season
!  Year
!  School
!  Rank
!  Weigh Class
!  Record
!  Win
!  Bonus
|-
|2019
|Senior
|rowspan=4|Penn State University
|#1 (1st)
|rowspan=4|157
|31–0
|100.00%
|83.87%
|-
|2018
|Junior
|#1 (1st)
|26–1
|96.30%
|77.78%
|-
|2017
|Sophomore
|#1 (1st)
|27–0
|100.00%
|92.59%
|-
|2016
|Freshman
|#1 (2nd)
|33–2
|94.44%
|88.89%
|-
|colspan=5 bgcolor="LIGHTGREY"|Career
|bgcolor="LIGHTGREY"|117–3
|bgcolor="LIGHTGREY"|97.69%
|bgcolor="LIGHTGREY"|85.78%

References

External links
 Jason Nolf's Rokfin Channel
 

Living people
1996 births
People from Pennsylvania
Penn State Nittany Lions wrestlers
Pan American Wrestling Championships medalists
American male sport wrestlers
20th-century American people
21st-century American people